Wanchese may refer to:

 Wanchese (Native American leader), Powhatan Roanoac chief encountered by colonists of the Roanoke Colony
 Wanchese, North Carolina, settlement named for him